Go to Blazes can mean:

 Go to Blazes an English-language expression similar to telling someone to go away.
 Go to Blazes (1930 film), a 1930 American short film.
 Go to Blazes (1942 film), a 1942 British short film featuring Will Hay.
 Go to Blazes (1956 film), a 1956 Canadian short film .
 Go to Blazes (1962 film), a 1962 British comedy film featuring Dennis Price and Maggie Smith.